Maria Golimowska-Chylińska (born 28 August 1932) is a former Polish volleyball player, a member of Poland women's national volleyball team in 1955–1966, a bronze medalist of the Olympic Games Tokyo 1964, a bronze medalist of the World Championship (1956, 1962) and medalist of the European Championship (silver in 1963, bronze in 1958), Polish Champion (1961).

Personal life
She was born in Lachowo, but now she has been living in Warszawa. His husband Marian is former basketball player. She has daughter Małgorzata and son Marian Jr.

External links
 
 

1932 births
Living people
People from Kolno County
Sportspeople from Podlaskie Voivodeship
Polish women's volleyball players
Volleyball players at the 1964 Summer Olympics
Olympic volleyball players of Poland
Olympic medalists in volleyball
Olympic bronze medalists for Poland
Medalists at the 1964 Summer Olympics